"Run of the Mill" is a ballad by English heavy metal band Judas Priest from their debut album Rocka Rolla. The song was the first written by guitarist K. K. Downing, soon after vocalist Rob Halford joined the band. Downing wrote it, in part, to display Halford's unique vocal range.

The track was first recorded as a demo circa 1973, along with another early Priest song, "Whiskey Woman". This track would later surface in altered form on Priest's second album as "Victim of Changes". Priest's manager at the time, Dave Corke, brought the demo to Gull Records, who would later sign Priest after their president, David Howells, attended a performance of the band, with Budgie at London's Marquee Club on 11 February 1974. The song was later recorded properly for their debut, Rocka Rolla, in the summer of 1974.

The song's lyrics are about a poor old man, whose "prospects" for a good life "vanished", now embattled and confused by today's society. Following the first two verses is a long guitar jam with Glenn Tipton and Downing. At the end of the song, the music gets heavier as Halford shows off his vocal range by wailing the end lines.

"Run of the Mill" was Priest's longest recorded track until "Cathedral Spires", a track from their 1997 album, Jugulator. It was also the longest track co-written by Rob Halford, Glenn Tipton, and K. K. Downing prior to "Lochness", a track from their 2005 album, Angel of Retribution.

Although Priest has not performed the song since the mid-1970s, many fans and critics consider it to be one of the highlights of the album and a classic early Priest track.

Personnel
Rob Halford – vocals
K. K. Downing – guitar
Glenn Tipton – guitar, synthesizer 
Ian Hill – bass guitar
John Hinch – drums

References

Judas Priest songs
1974 songs
Songs written by Rob Halford
Songs written by K. K. Downing
Songs written by Glenn Tipton
British hard rock songs